Saint Vincent and the Grenadines competed at the 2020 Summer Paralympics in Tokyo, Japan, from 24 August to 5 September 2021. This was the country's debut appearance at the Paralympics.

Swimming

See also
 Saint Vincent and the Grenadines at the 2020 Summer Olympics

References

Nations at the 2020 Summer Paralympics
2021 in Saint Vincent and the Grenadines sport